Alessandro Piccolo  may refer to one of several people:

 Alessandro Piccolo (agricultural scientist)
 Alessandro Piccolo (racing driver)